John Dwight "J.D." Ludden (April 5, 1819 – October 14, 1907) was a politician from Minnesota Territory and a former member of the Minnesota Territory House of Representatives, representing Marine, Minnesota. Ludden served as Speaker of the Minnesota Territory House of Representatives in 1852.

Born in Easthampton, Massachusetts, he moved to Minnesota in 1849. He was a lumber dealer.

References

1907 deaths
1819 births
People from Easthampton, Massachusetts
People from Washington County, Minnesota
Businesspeople from Minnesota
Members of the Minnesota Territorial Legislature
19th-century American politicians